"Who Stole the Cookie from the Cookie Jar?" or the cookie jar song is a sing-along game of children's music. The song is an infinite-loop motif, where each verse directly feeds into the next. The game begins with the children sitting or standing, arranged in an inward-facing circle.

The song usually begins with the group leader asking who stole a cookie from an imaginary (or sometimes real) cookie jar, followed by the name of one of the children in the circle.  The child questions the "accusation," answered by an affirmation from the "accuser," followed by continued denial from the "accused."  The accuser asks who stole the cookie, followed by the accused's saying the name of another child in the circle. The call-and-answer is potentially infinitely recursive, limited only by the number of participants or the amount of time the participants wish to spend on it.

Sometimes, a clapping or snapping beat is used by the children in the circle.  Sometimes, the other children in the group sing along with the "accuser" after the "accused" has been identified.  Some variations on the theme include the use by teachers of the song as a lesson in keeping with a beat and improvisation.  As with many children's songs, there can be many variations on the execution of the performance.

The song's lyrics are usually:
Accuser: (name of a child in the circle) stole/took the cookie/cookies from the cookie jar.
Accused: Who, me?
Accuser/Group: Yes, you!
Accused: Not me!
Accuser/Group: Then who?
This is followed by the "accused" saying the name of someone else, as "(name of a child in the circle) stole the cookie from the cookie jar," and the subsequent back-and-forth lines are repeated.  The song may be repeated ad infinitum or it may end - if it is being performed as part of a game, where members of the group are eliminated by failing to keep up with the prescribed beat or eliminated as a result of being chosen as one of the accused.

The fourth line is often changed to "Couldn't be!" Sesame Street's version also changed the third line to "Yeah, you!"

See also
 The priest of the parish

External links
Example of a lesson plan used by teachers, with lyrics, and appropriate grade level.
A variation on the performance of the piece, noting the importance of keeping to a rhythm.

English children's songs
English folk songs
Traditional children's songs
Year of song unknown
English nursery rhymes
Sing-along
Songs about crime
Cookies in popular culture